Jerry Interval, (October 10, 1923 – December 4, 2006), was an American portrait photographer and educator.

The early years 

Jerry Interval was born in Pittsburgh, Pennsylvania and grew up in the Brookline neighborhood of the city. When he was 17, he moved to Dunkirk, New York to attend Holy Cross Seminary, an all-male Roman Catholic boarding school that closed in 1968. While there, he studied to be a Passionist priest for a short time and graduated with a degree in psychology before returning to Pittsburgh.

In 1948, at the age of 25, he married Dora. The Intervals lived in McKees Rocks, Pennsylvania and Bellevue, Pennsylvania, before moving to the suburb of Franklin Park, Pennsylvania, where they lived for almost 43 years. They had seven children.

Photography career 

Interval was heavily Influenced by Yousuf Karsh, Alfred Stieglitz, Edward Steichen etc. in his teenage years and pursued photography as a hobby for several years before turning professional in 1968. In 1972, he earned the degree of master of photography from the Professional Photographers of America (PPA).

His work is documented in The Psychological Approach to Photographic Design, his associate thesis for the ASP, and in a self-published booklet described what he called crash-point symmetry, a compositional technique still widely used by professional photographers. Several examples of Interval's work—including some of his noted Merry Monks portraits—are housed at the Photo Antiquities Museum of Photographic History in Pittsburgh.

His work has appeared in Newsweek, Sports Illustrated, Reader's Digest etc.

A member of Professional Photographers of America and Photographic Society of America (PSA), Interval lectured at photography conferences and was an instructor for the Winona International School of Professional Photography for about 20 years.

Death 

He died on December 4, 2006, at the age of 83 due to complications from heart problems in the Pittsburgh suburb of Moon Township, Pennsylvania.

References

External links 
 Official Jerry Interval website
 The Psychological Approach to Photographic Design
 Award-winning portrait, wedding photographer, Pittsburgh Post-Gazette Obituary
 Professional Photographers of America (PPA)
 American Society of Photographers (ASP)
 Triangle Photographers Association (TPA)
 Photographic Society of America (PSA)

1923 births
2006 deaths
Artists from Pittsburgh
20th-century American photographers
American portrait photographers
Wedding photographers
People from Dunkirk, New York
Catholics from New York (state)